Chalab-e Olya (also Romanized as Chālāb-e ‘Olyā; also known as Chāl Āb) is a village in Sang Sefid Rural District, Qareh Chay District, Khondab County, Markazi Province, Iran. At the 2006 census, its population was 31, in 6 families.

References 

Populated places in Khondab County